Kerakat railway station (KCT) is a passenger rail station serving the town of Kerakat and nearby villages. It is very famous and small station of this area. This station has two platforms.

Outline 
Kerakat railway station is one of the railway stations on the Jaunpur–Kerakat–Aunrihar line section. The station falls under the administration of Varanasi division, North Eastern Railway zone.

Facilities
There Are Two Plateforms and Four Railway Track,So This Station is Work as Block & Crossing Station.
One Footoverbridge, Water Booth,Toilet,Shed,Unreserved Ticket Counter, Vehicle Parking etc. is Also Available.

Trains 
 Suhaildev Express
 Barauni–Gondia Express
 Loknayak Express
 Bandra–Ghazipur Express
 Sadbhavna Express
 Some other Passenger trains.

History 
This station was established on 21 March 1904 when Aunrihar–Kerakat–Jaunpur line was opened under the administration of Bengal and North Western Railway. The Aunrihar–Kirakat–Jaunpur line was constructed as a -wide metre-gauge line by the Bengal and North Western Railway in 1904.
This Station Rebuilt in 2010-2011 From Meter gauge station to Broad Gauge Station with single line.
Now in 2022 old Station building Is Demolished & New Station Building With Double Line Electrified Track Functioning From 23 April 2022

See also
Bengal and North Western Railway
North Eastern Railway zone
Oudh and Tirhut Railway

References

External links

Railway stations in Jaunpur district
Railway Stations in Kerakat Sub District
Railway stations opened in 1904
1904 establishments in India
Varanasi railway division